The Elsick Mounth is an ancient trackway crossing the Grampian Mountains in the vicinity of Netherley, Scotland.  This trackway was one of the few means of traversing the Grampian Mounth area in prehistoric and medieval times.  The highest pass of the route is attained within the Durris Forest.  Notable historical structures in the vicinity are Maryculter House, Lairhillock Inn and Muchalls Castle.  Most of the lands through which the Elsick Mounth passes are within the Durris Forest; while this forest would have been a mixed deciduous forest in ancient times, currently it is managed as a coniferous monoculture with extensive amounts of clearfelling and subsequent replanting.

History
Roman legions marched from Raedykes to Normandykes Roman Camp at the south of Peterculter as they sought higher ground evading the bogs of Red Moss and other low-lying mosses associated with the Burn of Muchalls. That march used the Elsick Mounth, one of the ancient trackways crossing the Grampian Mountains, lying west of Netherley. To the north the Romans proceeded to the next camp at Ythan Wells.

See also
 Drovers' road
 Meikle Carewe Hill

References

External links
Photograph of clearfelling along the Elsick Mounth, Aberdeenshire, Scotland
Article on the Elsick Mounth in Leopard Magazine by Nate Pedersen and Neil Ramsay

Geography of Aberdeenshire
History of Aberdeenshire